United Nations Security Council Resolution 264 was adopted on March 20, 1969, after a General Assembly resolution terminated the mandate of South West Africa (Namibia).

In accordance with UNSCR 264, the UN assumed direct responsibility for the territory and declared the continued presence of South Africa in Namibia as illegal, calling upon the Government of South Africa to withdraw immediately.

The Security Council condemned the refusal of South Africa to comply with previous resolutions, declared that South Africa had no right to enact the South West Africa Affairs Bill and that South African actions were designed to destroy the national unity and territorial integrity of Namibia through the establishment of Bantustans. The Council decided that, in the event of failure on the part of the Government of South Africa to comply with the provisions of the present resolution, it would meet immediately to determine the necessary measures to be taken. It gave the United Nations Secretary-General the responsibility of following up implementation of the resolution, and reporting back to the Security Council.

The resolution passed with 13 votes in favour; France and the United Kingdom abstained.

See also
 List of United Nations Security Council Resolutions 201 to 300 (1965–1971)
 United Nations Commissioner for Namibia
 United Nations Security Council Resolution 435

References 
Text of the Resolution at undocs.org

External links
 

 0264
 0264
 0264
1969 in South Africa
March 1969 events